Live at Abbey Road Studios 2004 is a live 2CD and limited edition DVD/2CD and vinyl record by Danish singer-songwriter Tim Christensen, released in 2004. It is the first officially released live solo recording of Christensen. The DVD appeared only in limited numbers and is now a rare item.

Overview 
Live at Abbey Road Studios 2004 contains a recording of the final show of the Honeyburst tour, held on 3 September 2004 in Studio 1 of the Abbey Road Studios, marking the 10-year-anniversary of Christensen's professional career as a musician, which was made possible by the success of his 2003 album Honeyburst. Additionally, the band had a really good year and was on a roll, so Christensen was happy to have it documented.

Christensen explains: "Originally we were just supposed to do a few shows in London to a few representatives of the music business. But instead of playing at some kind of boring club, we decided we would play at Abbey Road. Only later did we decide to record it and release it to DVD." By the time the day of the recording had arrived, Christensen found recording the show outweighed impressing the audience with the possibility of being promoted worldwide, although the latter would be nice. Christensen's record label wanted to use the concert to showcase Honeyburst to several of their executives across Europe, although it is not known whether there were any present. Another reason for the concert was that Christensen's contract would be running out half a year later, meaning they were looking for something nice to do before negotiations started. The Abbey Road Studios were chosen was because of Christensen's intense love for The Beatles, and in part was to make up for the disappointment Christensen experienced recording Rotator there in 1995–96, this time making it a proper homage to The Beatles, of whom Christensen has always been a big fan.

The concert was composed of two sets; one with full band, one unplugged. The setlists contained songs from the two solo albums that had been released by then, Secrets on Parade (2000) and Honeyburst (2003), as well as from the eponymous debut album of Christensen's former band, Dizzy Mizz Lizzy (1994). The DVD includes interview and backstage footage, as well as the documentary "Tim Christensen: From Roskilde to Abbey Road" by the Danish film maker Theis Molin, which follows Christensen and band from their 2004 performance on the Green Stage of the Roskilde Festival to the show at the Abbey Road Studios. This music DVD was released in a time when the DVD market in Denmark was just starting to develop, whereas in other countries this was already an established market.

Track listing 
All lyrics by Tim Christensen, except where noted. 

Limited edition bonus DVD

Personnel 

Band
 Tim Christensen – lead vocals, guitars, graphic design
 Lars Skjærbæk – guitars, Mellotron, backing vocals
 Nicolai Munch-Hansen – bass guitar
 Olaf Olsen – drums

Additional crew
 Dan Christensen – graphic design
 Rune Nissen-Petersen – executive producer
 René Cambony – A&R
 Christian Odd – product manager

Live at Abbey Road post-production
 René Szczyrbak – film producer
 Bente Mikkelsen – production manager
 Jesper Bøjlund (STV Television) – line producer
 Morgens Zender – technical coordinator
 Søren Hansen – technical coordinator
 Sara Bruun – assistant
 Thomas Argiris – assistant
 Uffe Egeberg – editor
 Eystein Jakobsen – editor
 Adam Bendixen – editor, vision mixer
 Jakob Kahlen – graphics
 David Moritz – DVD authoring
 Peter Aagaard – sound mixer bonus material

Live at Abbey Road recording
 Anders-Christian Dahl – camera operator
 Uffe Egeberg – camera operator
 Preben Hjorth – camera operator
 Kim Refslund – camera operator
 Carsten Horsted – camera operator
 Christian Puggaard – steadicam
 Michael Petersen – focus puller
 Gawian Kamelarczyk – camera assistant

Live at Abbey Road crew
 Finn Jansen – live sound engineer
 Mads Nørregaard – monitor sound engineer
 Jonas Jacobsen – backline technician
 John Henry's Ltd – stagehands
 CrewCo – stagehands
 Woodlands (Worchestershire) Ltd – generators
 Kasper Christiansen – lighting designer
 Jacob Bækmand – lighting crew, rigger
 Jonas Ritz – lighting crew, rigger
 Nils Laursen – lighting crew, rigger
 Frans Andersen – lighting crew, rigger
 Stine Hein (PDH) – live production
 Nicci Welsh – make-up artist
 Gitte Gammelgaard – still photographer
 Thomas Holm Jørgensen – journalist bonus material

From Roskilde to Abbey Road crew and post-production
 Theis Molin – director, producer
 Christoffer Dines Dreyer – editor
 Anders Vadgaard Christensen – online/colourist
 Simon Levin – batch
 Niklas Schak (Greatmusic) – sound post-production

From Roskilde to Abbey Road recording
 SR P3-Live (Brodin, Jonsson & Ohde) – concert recording
 Lars Bonde – director of photography
 Thomas Papapetros – concert photographer
 Henrik Bloch – concert photographer
 Troels Kampmann – concert photographer
 Nis Bysted Andersen – concert photographer
 Peter Lassen – concert photographer
 Eline Sørensen – concert photographer
 Theis Molin – concert photographer, still photographer
 Christoffer Dines Dreyer – concert photographer
 Anders Vadgaard Christensen – concert photographer
 Claus Christensen – still photographer
 Gitte Gammelgaard – still photographer

Notes 

2004 live albums
2004 video albums
EMI Records live albums
Live video albums
Tim Christensen albums